Wadishewadi Dam, is an earthfill dam on burai river near shindkheda, dhule district  in the state of Maharashtra in India.

Specifications

Purpose
 Irrigation

See also
 Dams in Maharashtra
 List of reservoirs and dams in India

References

Dams in Nandurbar district
Dams on the Tapti River
Year of establishment missing